Tore Foss (21 February 1901 – 6 August 1968) was a Norwegian singer, actor and theatre director. He made his stage début at Chat Noir in 1927. He played at Balkongen from 1927 to 1928, and later worked for the National Theatre, Det Nye Teater, Centralteatret and Folketeatret. He participated in several films. Before his acting career, Foss had military training and became a reserve officer in the Norwegian Army. He married the actress Gunvor Hall in 1934.

References

1901 births
1968 deaths
Norwegian Army personnel
Male actors from Oslo
Norwegian male stage actors
Norwegian male film actors
Norwegian theatre directors

20th-century Norwegian male actors